AKA Target Campus: Attack the Uniform is a Japanese Pink film directed by Mototsugu Watanabe and starring Kyōko Hashimoto, Hotaru Yukijiro, and Yutaka Ikejima. The film was released in Japan in June 1986. The film first appeared in the United States as Sexy Battle Girls at the San Francisco Independent film festival on February 14, 2009. The film was released on DVD in the United States on February 23, 2009.

Plot
When a high school girl, Mirai (Kyōko Hashimoto), gets transferred to a private school she finds that the evil headmaster (Yukijiro Hotaru) is selling the girls in the school to local politicians for sex. The headmaster is also the person who humiliated her father (Yutaka Ikejima). Mirai vows revenge and uses her body and her special ability, the "Venus Crush", as a weapon to avenge her family.

Cast
 Kyōko Hashimoto as Mirai Asamiya
 Yukijiro Hotaru as headmaster Bush
 Yutaka Ikejima as Ken Asamiya
 Ayumi Taguchi as Susan Arashiyama
 Ayu Kiyokawa
 Saeko Fuji
 Reika Kazami

Production
Sexy Battle Girls was a spoof on Sukeban Deka, the popular manga and television series from the mid-1980s. In this film, the heroine wields a kendama instead of a yo-yo as in the original series.

References

Reviews

External links
 
 
 

1986 films
1980s Japanese-language films
Pink films
Shintōhō Eiga films
1980s Japanese films